Chasen may refer to:

 Chasen (surname)
 Chasen (band), Christian rock band from Greenville, South Carolina, USA
 ChaSen, morphological parser for the Japanese language
 Chasen's, restaurant in Beverly Hills, California, USA
 Chasen Kanno, American College of Sports Medicine certified personal trainer, Hawaii, USA
 Chasen's mountain pit viper (Garthius chaseni), venomous snake found in Borneo
 , a bamboo whisk used in Japanese tea ceremony.
 Chasen Shreve, American baseball player
Chasen Hines (born 2000), American football player